Crawford Notch State Park is located on U.S. Highway 302, in northern New Hampshire, between Bretton Woods and Bartlett. The  park occupies the center of Crawford Notch, a major pass through the White Mountains.

The park includes the Willey House historical site and the Dry River Campground with 36 sites. Hiking trails in the park lead to popular destinations such as Ripley Falls and Arethusa Falls.

References

External links
Crawford Notch State Park New Hampshire Department of Natural and Cultural Resources

State parks of New Hampshire
State parks of the Appalachians
White Mountains (New Hampshire)
Parks in Coös County, New Hampshire
Parks in Carroll County, New Hampshire
1913 establishments in New Hampshire